Pigfish may refer to:

 Fishes in the family Congiopodidae
 Redmouth grunt, Orthopristis chrysoptera (Linnaeus)
 Golden-spot hogfish, Bodianus perditio
 Red pigfish, Bodianus unimaculatus